Gargunnock is a small village in the Stirling council area,  west of Stirling, in Scotland. The  census population was 912. It is situated on the south edge of the Carse of Stirling, at the foot of the Gargunnock Hills, part of the Campsie Fells.

Several small burns flow down from the Gargunnock Hills

The last naturally suitable crossing point on the Forth before reaching Stirling Bridge is situated just outside Gargunnock. Thus, coupled with the land condition and drainage around the feet or the Gargunnock hills, made Gargunnock the ideal location to build a farming settlement.

During the occupation of Scotland, the English posted a battalion in the Peel tower on the outskirts of the village to protect this important ferry. It is believed that William Wallace brought his army through Gargunnock (called Gargowans at the time), setting up fort on the Kier Hill, to take control of this part of the river in advance of the Battle of Stirling Bridge. Bonnie Prince Charlie is also said to have passed through the village on his travels.

More recently, during the nineteenth century Gargunnock was famous for its fine oak-spale baskets, until intensive deforestation removed the raw materials necessary for this trade and the industry moved to Loch Lomond.

Gargunnock War Memorial was erected in 1919 to a design by Sir Robert Lorimer marking the local people killed during the First World War. Additional names were added at the close of the Second World War.

The majority of pupils from Gargunnock Primary continue their secondary education at the nearby Stirling High School, with others attending Balfron High School.

References

External links

 
 Gargunnock Village History

Villages in Stirling (council area)